Seth M. Wheeler (born January 17, 1992) is an American college baseball coach and current head baseball coach at Emporia State University. Previously, Wheeler served as an assistant coach focusing on pitchers at Emporia State, and served as the Junction City Brigade manager from 2015 to 2017. Wheeler played for the University of Central Missouri.

Career 
Wheeler began his collegiate baseball career at Butler Community College where he played for two years as a catcher. Wheeler then transferred to the University of Central Missouri where he played for two years after redshirting in 2012.

Early career 
In January 2014, Wheeler as named an assistant coach for the Junction City Brigade, a team he played for during his college years, and was promoted to manager eleven months later. During his time as the Junction City manager, Wheeler also served as an assistant coach at Butler Community College. Wheeler won the regular season and Mid-Plains League tournament championships during his time at Junction City.

Emporia State University 
Wheeler joined Emporia State University's baseball coaching staff in 2016 as an assistant coach. During his three years as an assistant coach, he helped the Hornets advance to the Mid-America Intercollegiate Athletics Association (MIAA) and NCAA Tournaments each of the three years, winning the MIAA Tournament in 2017, and an overall record of 110–52, 76–34 conference record. On June 15, 2018, Wheeler was named the next head coach.

Head coach record

References

External links 
 Emporia State profile

1992 births
Living people
Butler Grizzlies baseball players
Central Missouri Mules baseball players
Butler Grizzlies baseball coaches
Emporia State Hornets baseball coaches
Sportspeople from Overland Park, Kansas
Baseball catchers